The church of San Pancrazio is found in central Genoa, in front of the piazza named after the same saint. A church at the site was first linked to the nearby Benedictine Abbey of San Siro in the 11th century.  A document from the 16th century notes that the church had been for centuries endowed by prominent Genoese families including the Calvi and Pallavicini. The present layout dates into the 18th century. In 1684, the church was demolished by the bombardment of Genoa by the naval forces of Louis XIV of France.  The architect Antonio Maria Ricca designed the present structure. The church was again damaged by aerial bombing during the Second World War.  It is now attached to the Sovereign Military Order of Malta as evidenced by the cross above the portal.

The apse frescoes were completed by  Giacomo Antonio Boni, while the triptych of the Life of St. Pancras, attributed to  Adriaen Isenbrandt, has been reconstructed within a decorative marble main altar.

Sources
 Official site from the Diocese of Genoa

17th-century Roman Catholic church buildings in Italy
Pancrazio
Baroque architecture in Liguria